In the Republic of India, a chief minister is the head of government of each of the twenty-eight states and three of the eight union territories. According to the Constitution of India, at the state-level, the governor is de jure head, but de facto executive authority rests with the chief minister. Following elections to the state legislative assembly, the governor usually invites the party (or coalition) with a majority of seats to form the state government. The governor appoints the chief minister, whose council of ministers are collectively responsible to the assembly. Given they have the assembly's confidence, the chief minister's term is usually for a maximum of five years; there are no limits to the number of terms they can serve.

, the office of the chief minister of Jammu and Kashmir is vacant with no new elections having being held ever since the autonomy of the former state was revoked. Of the thirty incumbents, one is a woman—Mamata Banerjee in West Bengal. Serving since 5 March 2000 (for ), Odisha's Naveen Patnaik has the longest incumbency. Mizoram's Zoramthanga (b. 13 July 1944) is the oldest Chief Minister, while Arunachal Pradesh's Pema Khandu (b. 21 August 1979) is the youngest Chief Minister. Nitish Kumar of Bihar has served for the most terms (8). Eleven incumbents belong to the Bharatiya Janata Party, three to the Indian National Congress and two to the Aam Aadmi Party. No other party has more than one chief minister in office.

Current Indian chief ministers

See also
 List of current Indian deputy chief ministers
 List of current Indian governors
 List of current Indian chief justices
 List of current Indian legislative speakers and chairpersons
 List of current Indian opposition leaders
 List of prime ministers of India

Notes

References

India

Chief Ministers